Peter James Knight (born 1 January 1954) is an Australian criminal who murdered a security guard in a Melbourne abortion clinic. Following his arrest and criminal trial, Knight is serving a life sentence with a minimum non-parole period of 23 years. , the incident remains the only killing by an anti-abortion activist in Australia.

Early years and background

Later, he led a hermit's life in the years leading up to the incident in a bush camp in the Killanbutta State Forest near , "off the grid" without a telephone or electricity. He did, however, frequently attend anti-abortion rallies in Sydney and Melbourne. Knight was also opposed to smoking, smokers, tobacco companies, and the taking of oaths.

Murder
On 16 July 2001, Knight walked into the East Melbourne Fertility Clinic, a private abortion provider, carrying a rifle and other weapons, including  of kerosene, three lighters, torches, 30 gags, and a handwritten note that read "We regret to advise that as a result of a fatal accident involving some members of staff, we have been forced to cancel all appointments today". He developed homemade mouth gags and door jambs to restrain all patients and staff inside a clinic while he doused them with the kerosene. Knight later stated that that he intended to massacre the 15 staff and 26 patients at the clinic and attack all Melbourne abortion clinics.

Once inside, he shot 44-year-old Stephen Gordon Rogers, a security guard, in the chest, killing him while clients and staff soon overpowered him.

Legal proceedings 
For many weeks after his arrest, Knight refused to answer questions or cooperate with police investigations. Due to his isolated life, Victorian Police were unable to confirm his identity until three months after his arrest, even though his photographs were published in major newspapers. According to psychiatrist Don Sendipathy, Knight interpreted the Bible in his own unique way and believed in his own brand of Christianity.

After choosing to not obtain legal representation, Knight was found guilty by a jury and, on 19 November 2002, he was sentenced to life in prison, with a minimum non-parole period of 23 years. Knight will be aged in his 70s before being eligible for parole. On 14 May 2003 Knight lodged an appeal against his conviction; however his appeal was dismissed as it was not lodged within fourteen days of his sentence, as required under the law. He is currently serving time in HM Prison Barwon, near Geelong.

See also
Abortion in Australia

References

External links

1954 births
Abortion in Australia
Anti-abortion violence
Australian anti-abortion activists
Australian hermits
Australian people convicted of murder
Australian prisoners sentenced to life imprisonment
Living people
Murder in Melbourne
People convicted of murder by Victoria (Australia)
People from Bathurst, New South Wales
Prisoners sentenced to life imprisonment by Victoria (Australia)